Vanacore Music is an American production music company for television, film, advertising, and digital media. Their services include a custom music division, production music libraries and music licensing expertise. They license music to a wide variety of networks and production companies. Vanacore has been featured on major cable networks that include ABC, NBC, CBS, FOX, The CW, Discovery Channel, Bravo, History Channel, SyFy, and is best known for its music on shows like Survivor, Wipeout, Big Brother, Fast N' Loud, The Wendy Williams Show and various other Reality TV shows.

History 
Vanacore Music was founded in 2004 by television composer David Vanacore.  David Vanacore began his music career as a studio session pianist/keyboardist for Cher and various other well-known artists.  In the late 90s he had the opportunity to work for famed television composer Mike Post as a studio keyboard player where he was introduced to the world of music supervision.

In 2000, David had his first major breakout as a TV composer on Mark Burnett’s first season of Survivor. As one of the first composers in this new genre, David was able to craft a style of music which today is commonly used for unscripted television programming.

Vanacore Music soon evolved as David began to hire composers in order to keep up with the high demand of music for unscripted programming for shows such as Big Brother, Temptation Island, American Chopper, Dirty Jobs and others that were becoming overnight hits during the Reality TV boom of the early 2000s.

Having written for hundreds of television shows to date, Vanacore Music is a major player in today's production music industry. The company offers thousands of underscore tracks for licensing from its 24/7 Music Library & Stage To Screen Library, as well as original music production from its roster of composers.

References

External links
Vanacore Music at Vanacore Music
Vanacore Music at IMDB

Companies based in California
Companies based in New York (state)
Publishing companies established in 2004
Music publishing companies of the United States